

Erich Diestel (8 November 1892 – 3 August 1973) was a general in the Wehrmacht of Nazi Germany during World War II. He was a recipient of the Knight's Cross of the Iron Cross.

Awards and decorations

 Knight's Cross of the Iron Cross on 8 October 1944 as Generalleutnant and commander of 346th Infantry Division

References	

 

1892 births
1973 deaths
People from Iława
People from West Prussia
Lieutenant generals of the German Army (Wehrmacht)
German Army personnel of World War I
Prussian Army personnel
Recipients of the clasp to the Iron Cross, 1st class
Recipients of the Gold German Cross
Recipients of the Knight's Cross of the Iron Cross
German prisoners of war in World War II
Reichswehr personnel